Sachio (written: 祥雄, 幸生, 幸夫, 倖生 or 左千夫) is a masculine Japanese given name. Notable people with the name include:

, pen-name of Itō Kōjirō, Japanese poet and writer
, Japanese baseball player
, Japanese architect
, Japanese businessman
, Japanese footballer

Japanese masculine given names